Titus Creek is a stream in Adair and Macon Counties in the U.S. state of Missouri.

Titus Creek has the name of William Titus, the proprietor of a local watermill.

See also
List of rivers of Missouri

References

Rivers of Adair County, Missouri
Rivers of Macon County, Missouri
Rivers of Missouri